Bucks Lake is a reservoir in Plumas County, California, created in 1928 by the construction of Bucks Storage Dam on Bucks Creek, a tributary of the Feather River.  The dam is managed by the Pacific Gas and Electric Company.

See also
 List of lakes in California
 List of dams and reservoirs in California

References

Reservoirs in Plumas County, California
Reservoirs in California
1928 establishments in California
Reservoirs in Northern California